Asian Treasures is a 2007 Philippine television drama adventure series broadcast by GMA Network. The series marked as the first Philippine television drama series to be filmed in Mongolia, Thailand and China, and is one of the most expensive television series in the Philippine television costing more than 140 million Philippine pesos. Directed by Eric Quizon, it stars Robin Padilla and Angel Locsin. It premiered on January 15, 2007 on the network's Telebabad line up replacing Captain Barbell. The series concluded on June 29, 2007 with a total of 118 episodes. It was replaced by Mga Mata ni Anghelita in its timeslot.

The series is streaming online on YouTube.

Cast and characters

Lead cast
 Robin Padilla as Elias Pinaglabanan / Susi / Diego
 Angel Locsin as Gabriela Agoncillo / Emma / Abigail Mediran

Supporting cast
Marvin Agustin as Hector Madrigal
Diana Zubiri as Ingrid Vargas / Urduja
Eddie Garcia as Wakan U. Matadtu / Supremo / Datu Makatunaw
Ronaldo Valdez as Ulysses Agoncillo / Plaridel
Caridad Sanchez as Miranda / Melchora
Jaime Fabregas as Pio Roman Dalisay / Gomburza
Joonee Gamboa as Julian Agoncillo / Sulaiman
Rommel Padilla as Leo
Gio Alvarez as Cedric Samonte
Marky Cielo as Mateo Madrigal
Glaiza de Castro as Clara Pinaglabanan
Margaret Wilson as Via
Ella V. as Lady Grace
Francis Magundayao as Pogi

Recurring cast
 Menggie Cobarrubias as Pablito
 Mon Confiado as  X / Xander
 Katarina Perez as Pia
 Megan Young as Anna
 Jerome Calica as Y / Yagon
Gina Alajar as Elvira
Paolo Contis as Victor
Bembol Roco as Marcus Vergara
Gardo Versoza as Socrates
Sandy Andolong as Araceli
July Hidalgo as a terrorist
Rita Iringan as Charlene
Ailyn Luna as Venice
Ken Punzalan as Gilbert
Rea Nakpil as Z
Gail Lardizabal as Savanah Vergara 
Berting Labra as Jose 

Guest cast
Sunshine Cruz as Esmeralda
Cesar Montano as Pancho Pistolero
Girlie Alcantara
Tommy Abuel as Swinton
Paul Salas as young Hector
JM Reyes as young Diego
Ella Guevara as young Gabriela
Bianca Pulmano as young Ingrid
Andrew De Real
Ace Espinosa
Joe Gruta
Ping Medina as Mateo
Pocholo Montes as Takeshi
Boots Plata
Jen Rosendhal as Marie
Ti Tiu
Armando Paez as the 'Mamang Sorbetero'
Andrew Schimmer as Zoilo
Gayle Valencia as Lea

Ratings
According to AGB Nielsen Philippines Mega Manila household ratings, the pilot episode of Asian Treaures earned a 41.8% rating. While the final episode garnered a 38.1% rating.

Accolades

References

External links
 

2007 Philippine television series debuts
2007 Philippine television series endings
Fantaserye and telefantasya
Filipino-language television shows
GMA Network drama series
Philippine action television series
Television shows filmed in China
Television shows filmed in Mongolia
Television shows filmed in Thailand
Television shows set in the Philippines
Philippine adventure television series